The CAPC tram stop came into service 23 July 2007 on line  of the tramway de Bordeaux. It takes its name from the nearby CAPC musée d'art contemporain de Bordeaux.

Situation
The station is located on Quay Louis XVIII in Bordeaux.

Junctions
 Buses of the TBC

Close by
 CAPC (Centre d'arts plastiques contemporains)
 Cité du Vin

See also
 TBC
 Tramway de Bordeaux

External links
 

Bordeaux tramway stops
Tram stops in Bordeaux
Railway stations in France opened in 2007